The 1951 Scottish League Cup final was played on 27 October 1951, at Hampden Park in Glasgow and was the final of the sixth Scottish League Cup competition. The final was contested by Dundee and Rangers. Dundee won the match 3–2, thanks to goals by Alf Boyd, Bobby Flavell and Johnny Pattillo.

Match details

References

External links
 Soccerbase

1951
League Cup Final
Scottish League Cup Final 1951
Scottish League Cup Final 1951
Scottish League Cup Final 1951
Scottish League Cup Final 1951